The  is a herb garden located on Mount Rokkō above Kobe, Japan. It is open daily; an admission fee is charged.

The garden is accessed by Shin-Kobe Ropeway gondola lift from downtown Kobe. It features over 75,000 herbs (200 varieties), plus greenhouses, restaurant and cafe, museums, exhibits, and gift shops.

The garden was built in 1991.

See also 

 List of botanical gardens in Japan

References 
 Nunobiki Herb Garden (Japanese)
 Feel Kobe entry
 56th CIRP General Assembly description

Herb gardens
Botanical gardens in Japan
Gardens in Hyōgo Prefecture
Geography of Kobe
Tourist attractions in Kobe
Buildings and structures in Kobe
Greenhouses in Japan